The Norfolk and Western 2300, also known as the Jawn Henry, was a single experimental steam turbine locomotive of the Norfolk and Western Railway. The N&W placed it in the TE class. It was nicknamed "the Jawn Henry" after the legend of John Henry, a rock driller who famously raced against a steam drill and won, only to die immediately after. It was designed to demonstrate the advantages of steam turbines espoused by Baldwin Chief Engineer Ralph P. Johnson. It was the longest steam locomotive that was ever built. The unit looked similar to the C&O turbines but differed mechanically; it was a C+C-C+C with a Babcock & Wilcox water-tube boiler with automatic controls. The boiler controls were sometimes problematic, and (as with the C&O turbines) coal dust and water got into the electric traction motors. Number 2300 was retired, stricken from the N&W roster on January 4, 1958 and scrapped later in 1961.

References 

Unique locomotives
Scrapped locomotives
Steam turbine locomotives
Baldwin locomotives
Experimental locomotives
Individual locomotives of the United States
Steam locomotives of the United States
Freight locomotives
Standard gauge locomotives of the United States
2300
High-pressure steam locomotives
Railway locomotives introduced in 1954